Box Township is an inactive township in Cedar County, in the U.S. state of Missouri.

Box Township was established in the 1850s, and named after one Mr. Box, a pioneer settler.

References

Townships in Missouri
Townships in Cedar County, Missouri